The Caterpillar 3126 is a turbocharged 7.2L inline 6-cylinder diesel engine manufactured by Caterpillar and first introduced in 1997; it was the first electronic mid-range diesel engine that Caterpillar produced.  It is the successor to the Caterpillar 3116 engine and was replaced by the Caterpillar C7 engine in 2003.  It is a medium-duty engine and has been used in dump trucks, long haul trucks, ambulances, buses, RVs, boats, cranes, fire trucks, and more. In 1998, Caterpillar released an improved version, the 3126B; in 2002, the 3126E was released; though these improved versions only affected engine electronics, not the actual engine design. Caterpillar launched a three-tier system of overhaul kits for the 3126 and its C7 successor in 2011.

It was rated for multiple power applications from 170HP to 330HP.

References

Diesel engines
Caterpillar Inc.
Straight-six engines
Internal combustion piston engines
Products introduced in 1997